is a Japanese rugby sevens player. She plays for Japan's women's rugby sevens team. She competed at the 2016 Summer Olympics as part of the Japan women's national rugby sevens team. Kuwai became the first Japanese rugby player to score a try at an Olympic Game.

References

External links 
 
 

1989 births
Living people
People from Hokkaido
Sportspeople from Hokkaido
Olympic rugby sevens players of Japan
Japanese rugby sevens players
Japan international women's rugby sevens players
Rugby sevens players at the 2016 Summer Olympics
Rugby union players at the 2014 Asian Games
Rugby union players at the 2018 Asian Games
Asian Games gold medalists for Japan
Asian Games silver medalists for Japan
Asian Games medalists in rugby union
Medalists at the 2014 Asian Games
Medalists at the 2018 Asian Games